The Highland Renaissance Festival is a permanent Renaissance Festival located on former farmland in Eminence, Kentucky and set in the fictional early 14th century village of Briarwood in the Highlands of Scotland in the time when Robert the Bruce ruled.  The year 1320, to be exact.  It is in the center of a triangle created by the cities of Louisville, Lexington, and Cincinnati, and is the first permanent renaissance festival in the state of Kentucky.

Features
The festival features vendors and artisans who offer an assortment of hand-crafted items. A cast of actors portray life as it would have been during this time. These include:  
 The Briarwood Players (The King's Retinue)  
 The Minions of Mischief (The Teenage Guild)  
 The Gaelic Gambol (The Celtic Dance Troupe)  
 The Faewood Grove (The Faerie Guild)  
 and The Clan Balaur (The Gypsy/Rom Encampment).   
Stage entertainment includes a mud show (Nuttin' But Mud), armored jousting (Round Table Productions), a circus-style sideshow (The Pickled Brothers), Fae Lore and faerie tales (Ebeneezer Grumpypants), and musicians performing historical and original songs. Throughout the festival there are family-oriented activities such as craft demonstrations, human-powered rides, and games. Makala's Inn, HooDoo's Pub, and The Twisted Thistle (The 21+ Pub) provide food, drinks, and continuous shows. Attendance in 2007 averaged over 1000 people a day. This year completed  years. 

The land is also used for other events during the year, such as a Celtic Fest and Highlands Games in late September and a Dickens Festival in December.

See also 

 Renaissance fair
 List of Renaissance fairs
 Reenactment
 Jousting
 Society for Creative Anachronism
 List of open air and living history museums in the United States

References

External links 
 Official website
 Celtic Fest website

Festivals in Kentucky
Tourist attractions in Henry County, Kentucky
Renaissance fairs
Festivals established in 2006
2006 establishments in Kentucky
Scottish-American culture in Kentucky